Kellyville is an electoral district of the Legislative Assembly in the Australian state of New South Wales. It is due to be contested for the first time at the 2023 election.

It is an urban electorate in the Hills District in Sydney's north west, taking in the suburbs of Beaumont Hills, Bella Vista, Kellyville, North Kellyville, Norwest and parts of Baulkham Hills, Castle Hill and Rouse Hill.

Kellyville was created as a result of the 2021 redistribution. The electorate of Baulkham Hills was abolished, and much of it was transferred to Kellyville. The remainder of Kellyville comprises parts of the former Castle Hill. Based on the results of the 2019 election, it is a very safe seat for the Liberal Party with an estimated notional margin of 23.1 percent.

References

External links
New South Wales Redistributions 2021

Electoral districts of New South Wales